Events from the year 1632 in Denmark.

Incumbents 
 Monarch – Christian IV

Events

Undated
 Christian IV starts the construction of the fortification Christianspris north of Kiel.

Births
 24 August  Peder Griffenfeld, statesman and royal favourite (died 1699)

Deaths 
 20 December  Melchior Borchgrevinck composer (born 1572)

References 

 
Denmark
Years of the 17th century in Denmark